The National Award for Literature in the Poetry Category has been presented annually by the Ministry of Culture of Spain since 1977.

It recognizes the best work of poetry by a Spanish author, in any of the Spanish languages. Works are nominated by a jury of experts, and must be first editions published in Spain in the prior year. It includes a monetary prize of €20,000.

Its antecedent was the National Literature Contest in the Poetry Category, part of national contests established by Royal Order of the Ministry of Public Instruction and Fine Arts of 27 September 1922. It was given from 1924 to 1973.

List of winners

1st era: National Literature Contest in the Poetry Category

2nd era: National Award for Literature in the Poetry Category

References

External links
  

1922 establishments in Spain
1973 disestablishments in Spain
1977 establishments in Spain
Awards disestablished in 1973
Awards established in 1922
Awards established in 1977
Poetry awards
Spanish literary awards